Józef Bachórz (born 1934) is a Polish philologist, professor of Gdańsk University, and an expert in Polish poetry. He was the recipient on the 2003 Johannes Hevelius Award in the humanities category, Order of Polonia Restituta in 2004, as well as a number of other awards.

References

External links

1934 births
Living people
Polish philologists